Thomas Edward James King (born 9 July 1981), known professionally as Jamie Thomas King, is an English actor.

Early life
King was born in London and is the son of American screenwriter Laura Lamson and English television director Christopher King. He was educated at Dulwich College, Fine Arts College and the London Academy of Music and Dramatic Art.

Career
King began his acting career in the theatre in the Royal National Theatre's production of Alan Bennett's The History Boys. He has acted extensively in American and European film and television productions. He is best known for playing poet Thomas Wyatt in the television series The Tudors.

Filmography

Film

Television

References

External links

1981 births
21st-century English male actors
Alumni of the London Academy of Music and Dramatic Art
English male film actors
English male stage actors
English male television actors
English people of American descent
People educated at Dulwich College
Living people
Place of birth missing (living people)